The 2018–19 FIBA Europe Cup play-offs will begin on 6 March and conclude on 24 April and 1 May 2019 with the 2019 FIBA Europe Cup Finals, to decide the champions of the 2018–19 FIBA Europe Cup. A total of 16 teams will compete in the play-offs.

Format
Each tie in the knockout phase, is played over two legs, with each team playing one leg at home.

The draw was made with the only restriction that these lucky losers could not be paired against each other, being decided all the bracket by the luck of the draw in the round of 16.

Qualified teams

Second round group winners and runners-up
The four group winners and second-placed teams from the second round advanced to the play-offs. In case of vacants due to opt-out options of teams transferred from the Basketball Champions League, these places would be filled with the best third-qualified teams.

Standings

Transfers from Champions League regular season
Eight teams from the 2018–19 Basketball Champions League Regular season transfer to the FIBA Europe Cup. These include the fifth and sixth-placed teams. The clubs from Basketball Champions League Regular Season which had opt-out clauses from playing in the FIBA Europe Cup Play-offs and in the event of them claiming fifth or sixth place, their spot would be filled by the best-ranked third-placed teams from the Second Round. They will be ranked according to the FIBA Europe Cup regulations.

Standings

Bracket

Round of 16
The first legs were played on 5–6 March, and the second legs were played on 12–13 March 2019. Team 2 played the second leg at home.

|}
Notes

First leg

Second leg

Quarterfinals
The first legs were played on 20 March, and the second legs were played on 27 March 2019. Team 2 played the second leg at home.

|}

First leg

Second leg

Semifinals
The first legs were played on 10 April, and the second legs were played on 17 April 2019. Team 2 played the second leg at home.

|}

First leg

Second leg

Final

The first legs will be played on 24 April, and the second legs will be played on 1 May 2019. Team 2 plays the second leg at home.

|}

References

External links
 

2018–19 FIBA Europe Cup
FIBA Europe Cup Play-offs